North Highland is a worldwide management consulting firm established in 1992, and is a founding member of Cordence Worldwide.  The firm is active in a number of industries, including:  Energy & Utilities, Financial Services, Healthcare, Life Sciences, Manufacturing, Media, Entertainment & Communications, Public Sector, Retail & Consumer Products, and Transportation.  

North Highland consistently features on Consulting Magazine's Best Firms to Work For lists.

Cordence Worldwide
North Highland is part of Cordence Worldwide, a global management consulting alliance with over 2,600 consultants in 50 offices around the world.

See also

 Management consulting
 List of management consulting firms

References

International management consulting firms
Management consulting firms of the United States